Gumapang Ka sa Lusak is a 1990 Filipino drama film directed by Lino Brocka.

Plot
Living in the slums of Manila, Jonathan, a college student likes to hangout with his wealthy college friends Eric, Dodo and RJ. One night at a bar, he met Rachel, a former sexy star who happens to be having an affair with Mayor Edmundo Guatlo. She is being supported financially by the mayor. But, she's always being followed by Edmundo's aide Falcon everywhere she goes. At the bar, Jonathan saw Rachel again, but when Falcon and his men forced her to come with them, Jonathan came and they're able to escape. Rachel would always visit her family, but her younger sister Gigi is getting embarrassed because of her affair with Edmundo. She also visits her former boyfriend Levi who was imprisoned for roberry. She asked Edmundo to use his connections to release Levi. While on the way to a party, Edmundo was tailed by his wife Rowena and was asked to transfer to her car. Edmundo is running for congressman. At the party, Rachel came and surprised Rowena.

Rowena visited Rachel and was offered money and asked to leave the house that she got from Edmundo. But Rachel said that Edmundo has the last say. But Rowena warned her that if she don't get rid of Edmundo, she will pour acid on her face and she will have her raped. Then, Rachel's father was fired from his work. He believes that it was Rowena who was responsible for this, because she talked to the manager where Rachel's father works. Then, Edmundo told Rachel that Levi is about to be released from prison. Upon Levi's release, Falcon told him that it was Edmundo who helped him. But, he has a tasked to do. When Rachel visited Levi, he revealed that he is hired to kill someone. He said that after he had done his job, they will start all over. Edmundo then ordered Levi to kill his opponent Atty. Ricardo Tuazon. As the election campaign went through, Levi killed Atty. Tuazon during a beauty pageant. Knowing that he would be killed by Edmundo's men, Levi decided to escape and went to the house of Rachel's family. But his father didn't want to get involved with Levi. Jonathan also came to help, but Rachel refuses because he didn't want him to get involved. But Falcon and his men trailed them, and Levi, Rachel and Jonathan managed to escape. But, Falcon and his men shot Levi to death and Rachel and Jonathan witnessed it. Rowena, became furious at Falcon because he didn't killed Rachel. But, Edmundo ordered not to kill Rachel. But, Rowena said that Rachel might went to Tuazon's camp and exposed everything. Rachel sought the help of Jonathan and his friends. Dodo offered her to stay in her cousin's place. While Eric, Dodo and RJ are on the road, they were taken by some policemen who found out to be Falcon and his men. Falcon asked RJ on where they brought Rachel. But, RJ fought back and he was shot dead by Falcon. There, he said to contact him if Rachel wanted to see her parents. If found out that Rachel's parents were kidnapped by Falcon. She then called Edmundo, there he admits that he was the one who ordered the abduction of her parents to make sure that she will contact her and told her that she still loves her. Then she played a tape recorded confession of Rachel, where she said that it was Edmundo who ordered the murders of both Levi and Atty. Tuazon. She also revealed that when she was still an actress, she was abducted by Edmundo's men and taken to a resort where she was raped by Edmundo. Edmundo offered her financial support for her and for her family. He also threatened her that if she disobey him, he will ruin her face, forcing her to leave her acting career and became Edmundo's mistress. Rachel told him that she would make several copies and she will spread it in national media. But she will give the tape to Edmundo, in exchange of her parents' freedom. But, when Rachel came to the place where parents are, Falcon came. She asked where is Edmundo, but Falcon said he was not around. There she was reunited with her parents, she then said to Falcon that if anything happens to her, she has her friends to help her. There Falcon said that if they had the guts to speak especially when they threaten them and their families. He said that he will burned them alive, but Rachel's mother slap Falcon, and Falcon shot her. Falcon being held by Rachel's father asked her to escape. While Rachel escaped, Falcon fought back and shot Rachel's father.

Now that Edmundo's crime is now exposed because of Rachel, his political career is over. During an event, Rowena was stabbed by Levi's mother avenging the death of her son. But, she was shot at the head killing her instantly. During a campaign rally, while Edmundo is giving his speech, Rachel came and told the people that he was the one who ordered the murders of her parents, Levi and his opponent Atty. Tuazon. But Edmundo asked the people that she was being used by his political opponents. There, Rachel's recorded confession was played. A furious Falcon shot Rachel then a chase ensued. Jonathan held Rachel in his arms. Rachel thanked Jonathan for everything before she passed away in the arms of Jonathan and was witnessed by Edmundo and was arrested after. Jonathan then looked at the sunset and remembers what Rachel told her that he's just getting started and told her to start right and clean.

Cast
Dina Bonnevie as Rachel Suarez
Christopher De Leon as Levi
Eddie Garcia as Edmundo Guatlo
Charo Santos as Rowena Guatlo
Bembol Roco as Falcon
Allan Paule as Jonathan
Francis Magalona as RJ
William Lorenzo as Eric
Timothy Diwa as Dodo
Perla Bautista
Anita Linda
Maureen Mauricio
Ernie Zarate
Lucita Soriano
Ray Ventura as Atty. Ricardo Tuazon
Archie Adamos

References

External links
 

1990 films
Philippine drama films
1990s Tagalog-language films
1990s thriller drama films
Filipino-language films
1990 drama films
Films directed by Lino Brocka